The 2010 Auto GP Series was the twelfth season of the former Euroseries 3000, and the first under its new name "Auto GP". The main sponsor of the series was PartyPoker.it. The series used the same  Lola B05/52 chassis that the A1 Grand Prix series used between 2005 and 2008.

Despite missing the first two rounds of the season due to his commitments in the FIA GT1 World Championship, DAMS driver Romain Grosjean claimed the championship title, taking four victories and seven podiums in total from the eight races he contested. DAMS drivers also took second and third places in the championship standings, as consistent finishes for Edoardo Piscopo and Duncan Tappy – neither driver won any of the races held – helped them into their final placings. Five other drivers took race victories over the season, with Carlos Iaconelli taking three – all in sprint races – but poor placings in the championship's feature races restricted him to only seventh place; Luca Filippi took two, with single victories each for Adrien Tambay, Julián Leal and Vladimir Arabadzhiev.

Teams and drivers

Race calendar and results
All rounds were part of the International GT Open weekends, excepting stand-alone round at Brno and Navarra round that supported Spanish GT Championship event.

Championship standings
 Points for both championships were awarded as follows:

In addition:
 One point will be awarded for Pole position for Race One
 One point will be awarded for fastest lap in each race

Drivers' standings

Teams' standings

References

External links
Official Auto GP site

Auto GP
Auto GP
Auto GP